Lee Ailesa (born 15 August 1954) is a former female international table tennis player from South Korea.

Table tennis career
She won a gold medal in the Corbillon Cup (women's Team event) at the 1973 World Table Tennis Championships with Chung Hyun-sook, Kim Soon-ok and Park Mi-ra for South Korea.

In addition she won three more World Championship medals; a team bronze in 1971 and two team silver medals in 1975 and 1977 ,won also gold Swedish Open Championships (SOC) 1972 in Sweden respectively.

See also
 List of table tennis players
 List of World Table Tennis Championships medalists

References

South Korean female table tennis players
Asian Games medalists in table tennis
Living people
Table tennis players at the 1974 Asian Games
1954 births
Medalists at the 1974 Asian Games
Asian Games silver medalists for South Korea
20th-century South Korean women